Etisus dentatus is a species of crab that lives in the Indo-Pacific, including the Red Sea, South Africa, Madagascar, Mauritius, the Seychelles, India, the Andaman Islands, Japan, Taiwan, China, the Balabac Strait, the Torres Strait, New Caledonia, Fiji, Samoa, Tahiti and the Hawaiian Islands.

References

External links
 

Xanthoidea
Crustaceans of the Indian Ocean
Crustaceans of the Pacific Ocean
Crustaceans described in 1785
Taxa named by Johann Friedrich Wilhelm Herbst